Sunnyside is a populated place situated in the far west of Cochise County, Arizona, United States, located just north of the international border with Mexico.

History
Sunnyside was founded as a religious commune by Samuel Donnelly. Donnelly also co-founded the Copper Glance Mine. Donnelly's followers were known as Donnellites, a term Donnelly himself disliked. In 1900, Donnelly became sick with Bright's disease and died on April 14, 1901. By 1903, nearly everyone had left Sunnyside. Around 1912, the camp was revived as a ranching community.

Sunnyside's population in 1940 was 2 residents.

Although designated officially as a 'populated place', there are no inhabitants, and Sunnyside is known locally as a ghost town.

References

External links
 
 
 Sunnyside – ghosttowns.com
 Sunnyside – Ghost Town of the Month at azghosttowns.com

Populated places in Cochise County, Arizona
Ghost towns in Arizona